Donaghmede Shopping Centre is a mid-size shopping centre located in Donaghmede, a suburb in Dublin's Northside. 

The shopping centre is built on the site of the original Donaghmede House. The shopping centre had a H Williams supermarket as original anchor but was sold to Dunnes Stores in 1987. Dunnes moved the entrance inside the centre, and operates a two-storey anchor unit. The centre has a McDonald's restaurant in the car park, a pub called The Donaghmede Inn closed in 2020 due to covid, a cafe and a public branch library. It has over 50 shops and 2 levels of shopping and a petrol station.

Redevelopment plans
Proposals to redevelop  the shopping centre were under discussion for some years and as of 2007, permission for some redevelopment was given.

Rail Access

External links 
 Donaghmede Shopping Centre

Donaghmede
Shopping centres in County Dublin
Buildings and structures in Dublin (city)